The Greek Volleyball Super Cup is a volleyball club competition that takes place in Greece since 1998. It is an annual match contested between the Champion of Greek Volleyleague and the Cup’s Winner. The matches take place in different cities every year. The competition isn't held if one team has achieved the double in the previous season. Iraklis Thessaloniki have won the super cup four times, followed by Olympiacos who have won two trophies less. Aris Thessaloniki, Panathinaikos and Foinikas Syros have won the trophy one-time each.

Title holders

 1997: Aris
 2000: Olympiacos
 2004: Iraklis
 2005: Iraklis
 2006: Panathinaikos
 2007: Iraklis
 2008: Iraklis
 2010: Olympiacos
 2021: Foinikas Syros
 2022: Panathinaikos

The matches

Super game
In 2005 Iraklis achieved the double. However the match held between the Winner of League and Cup and the Runners-up of League and Cup. That match was called Super Game and recognized by Hellenic Federation as Super Cup.

Performance by club

References

Volleyball in Greece